Perlita Neilson (born Margaret Phillipa Sowden; 11 June 1933 – 7 April 2014) was an English film, stage and television actress. She was educated at the Aida Foster Theatre School. One of her most notable roles was in 1957 as Anne Frank in the London production of The Diary of Anne Frank.

Personal life 

She was born Margaret Phillipa Sowden in Bradford, but spent her early life in Argentina, where her father, Wilson Sowden, worked as an engineer. After her birth, her mother Isabella (née Gibson) returned to Buenos Aires, where Margaret attended stage school. She began her career at age nine with a variety group of the British Community Players. She married Bruce Sharman in 1956 in Surrey, UK. She married Henry Neilson in 1961 in Surrey, UK.  She died at age 80 in Brighton.

Filmography

References

External links 

 
 Perlita Neilson for the British Theatre Archive

1933 births
2014 deaths
English child actresses
English film actresses
English television actresses
English stage actresses
Actresses from Bradford
Alumni of the Aida Foster Theatre School